Monroe Township is a township in Shelby County, Iowa. There are 147 people and 3.7 people per square mile in Monroe Township. The total area is 39.5 square miles.

References

Townships in Shelby County, Iowa
Townships in Iowa